Theofanis "Fanis" Christodoulou (born May 22, 1965) is a Greek former professional basketball player. He played mainly at small forward, but his complete all-around skills allowed him to play all five positions. During his playing career, many sports journalists called him "The European Charles Barkley". While his nickname among his teammates was "Bembis" ("Baby"). 

Christodoulou was inducted into the Greek Basket League Hall of Fame in 2022. A FIBA Balkans Selection member, in 1991, and a two-time All-EuroBasket Team selection, in 1993 and 1995, Christodoulou is also a candidate for the FIBA Hall of Fame.

Professional career
Christodoulou started his playing career with the youth teams of the Greek club Dafni. He spent most of his pro club career with Panionios, where he played from 1983 to 1997. With Panionios, he won the Greek Cup title in the year 1991. Christodoulou spent the last year of his career playing with Panathinaikos. With Panathinaikos, he won the Greek League championship, in the 1997–98 season. After that, he retired from playing pro club basketball.

NBA draft rights
Christodoulou was drafted by the Atlanta Hawks, in the 1987 NBA Draft, with the 90th pick overall, but he never decided to leave Greece and play in the NBA.

National team career
Christodoulou was an important member of the Greece men's national basketball team that won the gold medal at the 1987 EuroBasket and the silver medal at the 1989 EuroBasket. Christodoulou was also a member of the Greece national team that finished in 4th place at the 1994 FIBA World Championship. He also played at the 1986 FIBA World Championship, the 1990 FIBA World Championship, the 1993 EuroBasket, the 1995 EuroBasket, the 1997 EuroBasket, and at the 1996 Summer Olympic Games.

Executive career
In 2022, Christoudoulo became the general manager of the Greek Basket League club Panionios.

Personal life
Christodoulou's older brother, Christos, was also a professional basketball player. They played together in the same club team, Panionios.
Fanis also owns an OPAP betting shop in Paros.

Awards and accomplishments

Club titles 
 Greek League: 1 (with Panathinaikos: 1997–98)
 Greek Cup: 1 (with Panionios: 1990–91)

Greek senior national team
 1983 Balkan Basketball Championship:  
 1984 Balkan Basketball Championship:  
 1985 Balkan Basketball Championship:  
 1986 Balkan Basketball Championship:  
 1987 EuroBasket: 
 1989 EuroBasket: 
 FIBA EuroBasket All-Tournament Team: 2 (1993, 1995)

Personal awards 
 FIBA Balkans Selection: (1991 I)
 2× Greek League All-Star: (1991, 1994 I)
 Greek League MVP: (1993)
 No. 4 retired by Panionios
 Greek Basket League Hall of Fame: (2022)
 FIBA Hall of Fame Candidate

References

External links 
FIBA Profile
FIBA Europe Profile
Draftexpress.com Profile
TheDraftReview.com Profile
USBasket.com Profile
Hellenic Basketball Federation Profile 

1965 births
Living people
1986 FIBA World Championship players
1990 FIBA World Championship players
1994 FIBA World Championship players
Atlanta Hawks draft picks
Basketball players at the 1996 Summer Olympics
Basketball players from Athens
Dafnis B.C. players
FIBA EuroBasket-winning players
Greek basketball executives and administrators
Greek Basket League players
Greek men's basketball players
Olympic basketball players of Greece
Panathinaikos B.C. players
Panionios B.C. players
Power forwards (basketball)
Small forwards